Moallem Kalayeh Rural District is a rural district (dehestan) in Rudbar-e Alamut District, Qazvin County, Qazvin Province, Iran. At the 2006 census, its population was 2,329, in 761 families.  The rural district has 14 villages.

References 

Rural Districts of Qazvin Province
Qazvin County